This is a demography of the population of the Cayman Islands including population density, ethnicity, religious affiliations and other aspects of the population.

Population

With its success in the tourism and financial service industries, the Cayman Islands have attracted many international businesses and citizens to relocate. The largest numbers of expatriates living in the Cayman Islands hail from Jamaica (11,703), the United Kingdom (1,708), the Philippines (4,119), and India (1,218). Approximately 8,139 more residents are citizens of various other countries. While the government does not restrict foreign land ownership, it does strongly enforce its immigration laws. Businesses are required to grant access to job openings to Caymanian citizens first; if none of them are suitable, the business may then seek employees from other countries. In order to work in the Cayman Islands, foreigners must have a job offer before immigrating.

District populations
The vast majority of its residents live on the island of Grand Cayman, at 67,493. According to the 2021 census, only 2,163 people lived on Cayman Brac or Little Cayman, bringing the total population to 69,656,
broken down as follows:
George Town: 34,399
West Bay: 14,931
Bodden Town: 14,268
North Side: 1,840
East End: 1,749
Cayman Brac and Little Cayman (Sister Islands): 2,163

Vital statistics

Structure of the population 
Structure of the population (31.12.2013) (estimates):

Ethnic groups

Although many Caribbean islands were initially populated by Amerindian groups such as the Taíno and Kalinago, no evidence of this has been found in the Cayman Islands. Therefore, native Caymanians do not have any Amerindian heritage from their own islands; however, a significant number of Jamaicans have settled in the Cayman Islands over the years, so they and their descendants may have some Amerindian blood via Jamaica. Slavery was less common on the Cayman Islands than in many other parts of the Caribbean, resulting in a more even division of African and European ancestry. Those of mixed race make up 41.3% of the population, with white Caymanians and immigrants of European ancestry making up 24.1%, and black Caymanians and immigrants of African ancestry following at 23.9%. South Asians, mainly Filipinos and Indians, as well as Caymanians of South Asian descent, make up 8.1%, and the remaining 2.6% belong to various ethnic groups.

Language

The official language of the Cayman Islands is English. Islanders' accents retain elements passed down from English, Scottish, and Welsh settlers (among others) in a language variety known as Cayman Creole. Caymanians of Jamaican origin speak in their own vernacular (see Jamaican Creole and Jamaican English). It is also quite commonplace to hear some residents converse in Spanish as many citizens have relocated from Latin America to work and live on Grand Cayman. The Latin American nations with greatest representation are Honduras, Cuba, Colombia, Nicaragua, and the Dominican Republic. Spanish speakers comprise approximately between 10 and 12% of the population and is predominantly of the Caribbean dialect. Tagalog is spoken by about 5% of inhabitants most of whom are Filipino residents on work permits.

Religion

The predominant religion on the Cayman Islands, as of 2021, is Christianity at 66.9%; this is down from over 80% in 2010. Denominations practiced include; Church of God, United Church, Anglican Church, Baptist Church, Roman Catholic Church, Seventh-day Adventist Church, and Pentecostal Church. Roman Catholic churches are St. Ignatius Church, George Town and Stella Maris Church, Cayman Brac.  Many citizens are deeply religious, regularly going to church, however, the number of Caymanians who identify as non-religious has skyrocketed since the 2010 census, with around 25% professing no religion or a denomination not widespread. This is up from 9.3% during the last census. Ports are closed on Sundays and Christian holidays. There are places of worship in George Town for Jehovah's Witnesses and followers of the Baháʼí Faith. The Cayman Islands also hosts a growing Jewish community.

Hinduism is a minority religion in the Cayman Islands and is one of the smallest religions. Although it is unknown as to when Hinduism was introduced to the Cayman Islands. There is no Hindu temple located in the Cayman
Islands, but there is at least one home which is set aside for the purpose of worship. There were only 98 Hindus in the Caymans according to the 2000 census (about 0.25% of the population). In the 2008 census, the number of Hindus increased to 510 (1% of the total population). The 2010 Census showed the number of Hindus decreasing to 454 (0.8% of the total Cayman Islands population).

References

External links
Cayman Islands Chamber of Commerce
UNESCO report on education in the Cayman Islands